Arflex is an Italian company that makes and sells contemporary furniture.

History

In 1947, after the war, a group of researchers and entrepreneurs began to work on two new upholstering materials, foam rubber and elastic tape made by Pirelli, which had a range of possible uses in interior furnishings. They presented the technical specifications of the new products to Marco Zanuso, who initiated a trial operations programme until 1950.

Between 1951 and 1954, Arflex produced various models of car seat designed by Carlo Barassi using foam rubber and elastic tape, which could replace standard production seats and offer more comfort, with removable covers and adjustable seatbacks. The most successful of the car seats were the "MilleMiglia" and the "Sedile Lettino", a seat that could be turned into a makeshift bed. Both were designed for the Fiat Topolino.

Zanuso became an influential designer in post-war Italy, associated with the ideology of the Modern Movement. Other designers who contributed to the Arflex range included: Franco Albini, Giancarlo De Carlo, Enrico Peressutti, Joe Colombo, Ambrogio Casati, Cini Boeri, Michele De Lucchi, Ettore Sottsass, Marco Piva, and Pieter De Bruyne.

See also 

List of Italian companies

References

External links
Official Website
Overview of Arflex designs at Liever Interieur

Companies based in Lombardy
Design companies of Italy
Furniture companies of Italy
Furniture retailers of the United States
Manufacturing companies established in 1948
Italian companies established in 1948
Design companies established in 1948
Italian brands